Stuart Harris Appelbaum (born 1953) is an American trade union leader. Appelbaum has been the president of the Retail, Wholesale and Department Store Union (RWDSU) since May 1, 1998. He is also president of the Jewish Labor Committee. In February 2022, he was elected board of directors of the National Endowment for Democracy, a U.S. government-funded non-profit.

Appelbaum spent his childhood in Hartford, Connecticut. As a youth, he was raised in a Conservative synagogue and was president of his United Synagogue Youth chapter. He attended Camp Ramah. He graduated summa cum laude from Brandeis University and received a Juris Doctor degree from Harvard Law School. On September 1, 2019, he married MUFG Bank business analyst Michihito Osawa in Battery Park, New York City. New Jersey governor Phil Murphy took part in the ceremony.

References

Living people
Trade unionists from Connecticut
People from Hartford, Connecticut
Jewish American trade unionists
Brandeis University alumni
Harvard Law School alumni
United Food and Commercial Workers people
American Conservative Jews
Retail, Wholesale and Department Store Union
1953 births